Maviddapuram railway station ( Māviṭṭapuram toṭaruntu nilaiyam) is a railway station in the village of Maviddapuram in northern Sri Lanka. Owned by Sri Lanka Railways, the state-owned railway operator, the station is part of the Northern Line which links the north with the capital Colombo. The station was not functioning between 1990 and 2015 due to the civil war. The Northern Line between Jaffna and Kankesanthurai was re-opened on 2 January 2015.

Services
The following train services are available from/to the station:

References

Railway stations in Jaffna District
Railway stations on the Northern Line (Sri Lanka)